Mbarara High School (MHS), is a boys-only boarding middle and high school located in the city of Mbarara, in Mbarara District in Western Uganda.

Location
The coordinates of MHS are: Latitude:-0.6155S; Longitude:30.6335E.

History
It was established in 1911 by Anglican, Christian missionaries affiliated with the Church of England. Mbarara High School is the oldest secondary school in Western Uganda. It has both ordinary level and advanced level classes. The land on which the school was built is owned by Ankole Diocese, of the Church of Uganda. While the church has ownership and control of the school, the Uganda Government, through the Ministry of Education, contributes to the school's budget. The Kumanyana protest movement of the 1940s, which demanded equality for the Bairu people of Ankole with the Hima, had its roots at the school.

Reputation
Mbarara High School is among the most prestigious schools in Uganda, owing to its excellent academic record.

Notable alumni
The school has many alumni, many of whom are active in Uganda's public and private sectors. The notable, among them include the following:
President Yoweri Museveni - President of Uganda 1986–Present.
Amanya Mushega - Former Secretary-General of the East African Community.
Elly Tumwine - Former Commander of the Army in Uganda (1986 - 1989). Member of Parliament (MP), representing the Uganda People's Defense Force (UPDF) (1986–Present). High-ranking UPDF officer.
Andrew Mwenda - A popular journalist and founder of the Independent Magazine.
Sabiiti Muzeyi - military officer and police officer
Kenneth Kimuli - comedian, playwright and journalist
Zeddy Maruru - military pilot and retired military officer
Francis Takirwa - military officer
Tumusiime Rushedge - surgeon, pilot, novelist, cartoonist and newspaper columnist
Charles Oboth Ofumbi - Ugandan Interior Minister
Emmanuel Karooro - educator, academic and academic administrator, and the Vice-Chancellor at Ibanda University
Eriya Kategaya - lawyer and politician
Sam Kutesa - politician and lawyer, former President of the United Nations General Assembly
Levi Karuhanga - military officer
Bright Rwamirama - politician and retired army officer
Mwesigwa Rukutana - lawyer and politician
Fred Ruhindi - lawyer and politician
Yoramu Bamunoba, Bishop of West Ankole, 1997-2007
Ernest Shalita, Bishop of Muhabura, 1990-2002

See also
 Education in Uganda

References

Boarding schools in Uganda
Mbarara
Boys' schools in Uganda
Educational institutions established in 1911
1911 establishments in Uganda